This is a list of the National Register of Historic Places listings in eastern Chester County, Pennsylvania.

This is intended to be a complete list of the properties and districts on the National Register of Historic Places in eastern Chester County, Pennsylvania, United States. Eastern Chester County is defined for this list as being the municipalities south and east of a line extending from Phoenixville to Exton to West Chester. The locations of National Register properties and districts for which the latitude and longitude coordinates are included below, may be seen in a map.

There are 320 properties and districts listed on the Register in Chester County, including 7 National Historic Landmarks. Eastern Chester County includes 113 properties and districts, including 4 National Historic Landmarks; the county's remaining properties and districts are listed elsewhere. One district, the Middle Pickering Rural Historic District, is split between Northern and Eastern Chester County, and is thus included on both lists.

Current listings

|}

Former listing

|}

References

Eastern